Atousa Pourkashiyan (born 16 May 1988) is an Iranian-American chess player. She holds the title of Woman Grandmaster, which FIDE awarded her in 2009. Pourkashiyan is Seven-time Iranian women's champion (2005, 2007, 2008, 2009, 2011, 2013, 2014) and a record holder among Iranian women chess players.

She was born in Tehran. Pourkashiyan won the World Youth Chess Championship of 2000 in the Girls U12 category.

In April 2010 Pourkashiyan won the Asian Women's Chess Championship in Subic Bay. She competed in the Women's World Chess Championship in 2006, 2008, 2012, 2017.

In team competitions, she has played for Iran at eight Women's Chess Olympiads (2000-2014), the Women's Asian Team Chess Championship, and the World Youth U16 Chess Olympiad.

References

External links
 
 
 
 
  English translation.

1988 births
Living people
Chess woman grandmasters
Iranian female chess players
World Youth Chess Champions
Asian Games bronze medalists for Iran
Asian Games medalists in chess
Chess players at the 2006 Asian Games
Chess players at the 2010 Asian Games
Sportspeople from Tehran
Medalists at the 2006 Asian Games